William Wilson (ca. 1720 – 12 December 1796) was a politician in Great Britain, and Member of Parliament (MP) for Ilchester in Somerset from 1761 to 1768.

References

 

1720s births
1796 deaths
Members of the Parliament of Great Britain for English constituencies
British MPs 1761–1768